The Jilțul Slivilești is a right tributary of the river Jilț in Romania. It flows into the Jilț near Șiacu.

References

Rivers of Romania
Rivers of Gorj County